Grmeč is a mountain in north-western Bosnia and Herzegovina. It is more than 60 kilometres long, stretching between the city of Bihać and the town of Ključ. Grmeč is surrounded by the city of Bihać and towns Bosanski Petrovac, Ključ, Sanski Most, and Bosanska Krupa.

Grmeč is the best-known place of bullfights or Bull wrestling in the Balkans. They are called the Corrida of Grmeč (Grmečka korida) and have been organised on every first Sunday in August for over 200 years, attracting thousands of visitors. These are fights between bulls themselves and there is no death of a bull. Fights happen in an empty field. The Corrida of Grmeč was depicted by the sculptor Slobodan Pejić. The sculpture of two bulls in a fight, made in bronze in 2004, has been compared to a confrontation of the oppressor and the oppressed or of the Bosnian people and the Austrian Emperor.

See also
List of mountains in Bosnia and Herzegovina

References

Mountains of Bosnia and Herzegovina